Migene González-Wippler is a Puerto Rican new-age author and a leading expert on the Afro-Caribbean religion of Santería.

Education 
González-Wippler was born in Puerto Rico and has degrees in psychology and anthropology from the University of Puerto Rico, and from Columbia University, from where she earned a Ph.D. in cultural anthropology.

Career 
In addition to her solid background in social sciences she has also worked as a science editor for the Interscience Division of John Wiley, the American Institute of Physics, and the American Museum of Natural History, and as an English editor for the United Nations in Vienna, where she resided for many years.   She is a cultural anthropologist and lectures frequently at universities and other educational institutions.   She writes about Santeria-its practices, beliefs and organization.

Bibliography

 El libro completo de magia, hechizos, y ceremonias
 El libro de las sombras
 Keys to the Kingdom: Jesus & the Mystic Kabbalah
 Book of Shadows
 The Complete Book of Amulets & Talismans
 Luna, Luna: Magia, poder y seducción
 La Magia de las piedras y los cristales
 Sueños: Lo que significan para usted
 Amuletos y Talismanes
 La magia y tú
 What Happens After Death: Scientific & Personal Evidence for Survival
 Santería: La Religión
 Dreams and What They Mean to You
 The Complete Book of Spells, Ceremonies & Magic
 Las llaves del reino: Jesús y la cábala cristiana
 Kabbalah For The Modern World
 Angelorum: El libro de los ángeles
 Santería: mis experiencias en la Religión
 Peregrinaje: la vida después de la muerte
 Santería: the Religion: Faith, Rites, Magic, Llewellyn Publications: 2002  
 Cabala para el mundo moderno
  Powers of the Orishas: Santeria and The Worship of Saints

References

External links
Biography on Llwellyn's On-line Bookstore

American women writers
Living people
Puerto Rican women writers
Puerto Rican writers
Year of birth missing (living people)
People associated with the American Museum of Natural History
Columbia Graduate School of Arts and Sciences alumni